Ivonne is a Spanish female name derived from the French name Yvonne.

People
Ivonne Belen
Ivonne Coll
Ivonne Harrison
Ivonne Higuero
Ivonne Leal
Ivonne Montero
Ivonne Ortega Pacheco
Ivonne Teichmann

Given names
Feminine given names
Spanish feminine given names